Cupriavidus respiraculi is a Gram-negative, nonfermenting bacterium of the genus Cupriavidus and family Burkholderiaceae. It has been isolated from cystic fibrosis patients.

References

External links
Type strain of Cupriavidus respiraculi at BacDive -  the Bacterial Diversity Metadatabase

Burkholderiaceae
Bacteria described in 2004